The City of Onkaparinga is a local government area (LGA) located on the southern fringe of Adelaide, South Australia. It is named after the Onkaparinga River, whose name comes from Ngangkiparinga, a Kaurna word meaning women's river. It is the largest LGA in South Australia, with a population of over 170,000 people in both urban and rural communities and is also geographically expansive, encompassing an area of 518.3 km². The council is headquartered in the Noarlunga Centre with area offices situated in Aberfoyle Park, Woodcroft and Willunga.

History
The council was formed on 1 July 1997 as the City of Happy Valley, Noarlunga and Willunga from the amalgamation of the former City of Happy Valley and City of Noarlunga with part of the District Council of Willunga. It adopted the City of Onkaparinga name from 22 December 1997.

Culture
The South Australian Writers' Centre and  the City of Onkaparinga co-hosted the biennial South Australian Writers' Festival (2001–2011), renamed the South Australian Readers' and Writers' Festival from 2013 to 2015.

Demographics

Governance
The council meets at the chambers in Noarlunga Centre on Hannah Road once a month on a Tuesday at 6.30pm.

The City of Onkaparinga has 13 elected members (including the mayor). The city is divided into six electoral wards, with two councillors representing each. The mayor is elected at large by all electors.

The current council was elected in 2022 for a four-year term.

Suburbs

That is, postcodes 5047, 5051, 5153, and 5157–74 (inclusive).

Freedom of the City 
The Freedom of the City is reserved for military units which have, through their command, a significant attachment to the City of Onkaparinga. Freedom of the City is the highest honour the City can confer on a military unit.

Recipients 
Three military units have been awarded Freedom of the City:
 1998 - 40th Regional Cadet Unit Noarlunga
 2004 - Squadron 605 Australian Air Force Cadets and Australian Navy Cadets TS Noarlunga
 2016 - 619 Squadron, Australian Air Force Cadets

Key to the City 
The Key to the City recognises exceptional, outstanding achievement and is Council’s most prestigious award. The award acknowledges the outstanding contribution of an individual or organisation in furthering the ideals of the city or to recognise outstanding achievement.

Recipients 
 1998 - Dr Andrew "Andy" Sydney Withiel Thomas AO
 2006 - Mayor Ray Gilbert OAM JP & Edith Gilbert JP
 2019 - Richard "Richie" Julian Porte

See also
 Local Government Areas of South Australia
 List of Adelaide suburbs
 List of Adelaide parks and gardens

References

External links
City of Onkaparinga
Onkaparinga community snapshot

Local government areas in Adelaide
Local government areas of South Australia